The Tohono Oʼodham are a Native American people of the Sonoran Desert, residing primarily in the U.S. state of Arizona and the northern Mexican state of Sonora. The federally recognized tribe is known in the United States as the Tohono Oʼodham Nation.

The Tohono Oʼodham Nation, or Tohono Oʼodham Indian Reservation, is a major reservation located in southern Arizona, where it encompasses portions of three counties: Pima, Pinal, and Maricopa in the United States. It also extends into the Mexican state of Sonora.

Name 
The Tohono Oʼodham tribal government and most of the people have rejected the historical name Papago used by European colonizers. They call themselves Tohono Oʼodham, meaning "desert people".

The Pima, a competing tribe in this territory, referred to them as Ba꞉bawĭkoʼa, meaning "eating tepary beans". The Spanish colonizers learned that name from the Pima and transliterated it as Pápago, in their pronunciation. Anglo settlers in the area adopted that term.

History 
The historical lands of the Tohono Oʼodham stretched over much of what are now the jurisdictions of southern Arizona and Northern Mexico, across most of the Sonoran Desert. In the south their land abutted against that of the Seris and Opata peoples. To the east, they ranged to at least the San Miguel River valley. The people may have migrated further east in seasonal travel. The Gila River represents the northern limits. To the west, their lands extended to the Colorado River and the Gulf of California. The frontiers of their territory would have been shared to an extent with neighboring tribes.

These lands are characterized by wide plains bordered by tall mountains. Water is scarce but is believed to have been more plentiful before European colonization. Their practices of cattle grazing and well drilling decreased stream flows. Localized natural springs provided water in some areas. In some areas, the people also relied on tinajas, or potholes, that were filled with rainwater in the mountains. Rains are intensely seasonal in the Sonoran Desert, with much rainfall occurring in late summer monsoons. Monsoon storms are generally fierce and produce flooding. The remainder of rainfall generally falls in winter and is more gentle. Snows are extremely rare, and winters have a few days below freezing. The growing season is very long, up to 264 days in places.

The Tohono Oʼodham migrated between summer and winter homes, usually moving to follow the water. They built their summer homes along alluvial plains, where they channeled summer rains onto fields they were cultivating. Some dikes and catchment basins were built, as was typical of Pima practices to the north. But most streams were not reliable enough for the people to build permanent canal systems. Winter villages were built in the mountains, to take advantage of more reliable water, and to enable the men to engage in hunting games.

Historically, the Oʼodham-speaking peoples were enemies of the nomadic Apache from the late seventeenth until the beginning of the twentieth century. The Oʼodham were settled agricultural people who raised crops. According to their history, they knew the Apache would raid when they ran short on food, or hunting was bad.

Conflict with European settlers encroaching on their lands resulted in the Oʼodham and the Apache finding common interests. The Oʼodham word for the Apache 'enemy' is ob. The relationship between the Oʼodham and Apache was especially strained after 1871 when 92 Oʼodham joined Mexicans and Anglo-Americans and killed an estimated 144 Apache in the Camp Grant massacre. All but eight of the dead were women and children. The Oʼodham also captured 29 Apache children, whom they sold into slavery in Mexico.

Little of early Oʼodham history is known. That recorded by Europeans reflects their biases. The first European exploration and recording of Oʼodham lands was made in the early 1530s by Álvar Núñez Cabeza de Vaca of the ill-fated Narváez expedition. Esteban the Moor passed through these lands, one of the four survivors of the Narvaez expedition. He returned later to lead Fray Marcos de Niza in an attempt to find the mythical Seven Cities of Gold. Esteban was killed by the Zuni when he disrespected their customs, and de Niza cut short his journey. De Niza wrote that the native cities were grander than Mexico City, which led to the Coronado expedition.

Considerable evidence suggests that, before the late seventeenth century, the Oʼodham and Apache were friendly and engaged in the exchange of goods and marriage partners. Oʼodham oral history, however, suggests that intermarriages resulted instead from raiding between the two tribes. It was typical for women and children to be taken captive in raids, to be used as slaves by the victors. Often women married into the tribe in which they were held captive and assimilated under duress. Both tribes thus incorporated "enemies" and their children into their cultures.

The San Xavier District is the site of Mission San Xavier del Bac, the "White Dove of the Desert". This is a major tourist attraction near Tucson. The mission was founded in 1700 by Jesuit missionary and explorer Eusebio Kino. Both the first and current church building were constructed by Oʼodham. The second building was constructed under direction of Franciscan priests, during a mission period from 1783 to 1797. The oldest European building in present-day Arizona, the mission is considered a premier example of Spanish colonial design. It is one of many missions built in the Southwest by the Spanish on what was then the northern frontier of their colony.

Tourists sometimes assume that the desert people had embraced the Catholicism of the Spanish conquistadors. Tohono Oʼodham villages resisted such change for hundreds of years. During the 1660s and in 1750s, two major rebellions rivaled in scale the 1680 Pueblo Rebellion. Their armed resistance prevented the Spanish from increasing their incursions into the lands of Pimería Alta. The Spanish retreated to what they called Pimería Baja. As a result, the desert people preserved their traditions largely intact for generations.

Culture

The Tohono Oʼodham share linguistic and cultural roots with the closely related Akimel Oʼodham (People of the River), historically known as Pima, whose lands lie just south of present-day Phoenix, along the lower Gila River. The  ancestors of both the Tohono Oʼodham and the Akimel Oʼodham resided along the major rivers of southern Arizona. Ancient pictographs adorn a rock wall that juts up out of the desert near the Baboquivari Mountains.

On the nature of the Oʼodham, Eric Winston writes:

Debates surround the origins of the Oʼodham.  compete with claims that the Hohokam, who left the Casa Grande Ruins, are their ancestors.

In the Santa Barbara Mission Archive-Library are materials collected by a Franciscan friar who worked among the Tohono Oʼodham. These include scholarly volumes and monographs. The Office of Ethnohistorical Research, located at the Arizona State Museum on the campus of the University of Arizona, has undertaken a documentary history of the Oʼodham, offering translated colonial documents that discuss Spanish relations with the Oʼodham in the seventeenth and eighteenth centuries.

Oʼodham musical and dance activities lack "grand ritual paraphernalia that call for attention" and grand ceremonies such as pow-wows. Instead, they wear muted white clay. Oʼodham songs are accompanied by hard wood rasps and drumming on overturned baskets, both of which lack resonance and are "swallowed by the desert floor". Dancing features skipping and shuffling quietly in bare feet on dry dirt, the dust raised being believed to rise to atmosphere and assist in forming rain clouds.

Society 
Society focused on the family, and each member had specific roles to play. Women were in charge of food preparation and also gathered the bulk of food, although all members helped. Older girls in the family would be in charge of fetching water each morning, the duty would fall to the wife if there were no daughters. Women also wove baskets, and made pottery, such as ollas. Men performed many of the farming tasks, and hunted. Older men would hunt larger game like bighorn sheep, younger men and boys hunted small game. Most communities had a medicine man, a usually male position. Decisions were made by men in a communal fashion, with elders holding prominence. Children were free to play until age six, around which time they began to learn their roles. Grandparents and older siblings were the most frequent teachers, as parents tended to be very busy.

Marriages were generally arranged by parents, or if the parents had died, older siblings. Since individual villages tended to be closely related, marriages were generally between villages, as close relatives were not allowed to marry. A wife would generally move to the village of her husband, but exceptions could be made if the wife's village needed more help. Polygamy was allowed. Although women had little choice in whom they married, they could choose to leave their marriage if unhappy; they would then return to their village and a new marriage would be arranged.

Society was intensely communal, and there were few positions of authority. Hunters shared their catches with the entire village. Food and supplies were shared with those whose needed it. It was expected that if you had been given things in a time of need that you would repay the debt when you could.

Despite a shared language and heritage, the Oʼodham were only loosely connected across their lands. Loyalty laid with the village, not the people. However, the Oʼodham generally got along well with neighbors. They regularly gathered with nearby villages, and would even partner with them in times of conflict against outsider tribes. Gatherings for races, trade, socialization, and gossip were frequent events. Gambling was a common recreational event, with men playing a game with sticks similar to dice, and women playing a game which required tossing painted sticks. They would bet trinkets such as shells or beads, as well as valuables such as blankets and mats. Betting also occurred on races, which were the most important sport. Girls were already generally good runners due to being water fetchers, and all members needed to be able to run to escape danger or attacks. Day long races were popular events, and courses would be . Women played a field hockey-like game called toka which is still enjoyed and is a frequent school sport on the modern reservation.

Subgroups 
Though they shared a linguistic root with the Pima, and could understand the languages of nearby tribes, such tribes were considered distant cousins at best. Even within the Oʼodham there were linguistic and cultural differences that led to the groups being only loosely united. Different groups had different origin stories, linguistic quirks, and appearances. Where a person lived was the best indicator of which group they belonged to, more so than the other differences. As of the 1700s, when Europeans began to categorize the tribes, there were probably at least six groups. The actual number of groups has varied by author. The following categorization is from Eric Winston's 1994 textbook on the Oʼodham, and includes seven groups, along with some subgroups.
 Himuris  They lived along the southern edge of Oʼodham lands, in modern Mexico. In the west they lived up to the confluence of the Altar River and the Magdalena river in what is now Magdalena de Kino. Their range extended all the way to the eastern reaches of the Oʼodham. They were the first to make contact with Europeans.
 Hia C-eḍ  Divided into northern and southern groups, they stretched along the western border of the lands, from the furthest north to the southernmost reaches.  In the south they shared the land with the Seris, and those there may have had more in common with them than the rest of the Oʼodham. To the north they had contact with the Yumas, and the northern Hia C-eḍ shared some of their traits. The Hia C-eḍ dialect was the most distinct, and they spoke much faster than other groups. Since their lands were the hottest and driest they had very large ranges and migrations. Little of the land was suitable for farming, and thus the Hia C-eḍ were almost exclusively hunter-gatherers.
 Hu:huhla  The oldest group of the Oʼodham, they lived in a strip to the east of the Hia C-eḍ. The other tribes considered them to be "orphans"; it is possible they were there before the Oʼodham arrived and were assimilated. Their style of living mirrored the Hia C-eḍ, as there lands were also poor.
 Kohatk  They lived along the northern extent, and intermingled with the Pima. They extended south to modern Tucson. They had considerable trade and intermarriage with the Pimas.
 Koklolodi  Situated above the Himuris, but below the Totokwan.
 Sobapuris  This easternmost group lived between the San Pedro and Santa Cruz rivers. They took more cues from the Pima and lived in more permanent settlements. Their lands were on the edge of the Sonoran Desert and thus had better water supplies, ensuring year round settlement in most areas. Members only left the village to hunt and gather, and did not usually make seasonal migrations. Unfortunately their cooler lands, fertile fields, and consistent water made their land the most desired by European settlers, and their lands were the first to be taken over. The Sobapuris suffered the most from colonization.
 Totokwan  Centered around Ge Aji Peak, they inhabited the ceremonial center of the northern Oʼodham.

Warfare 
The Oʼodham were a generally peaceful people. They rarely, if ever, initiated conflict, and got along well with most neighboring tribes. The exception was the Apache, who were frequent raiders of the Oʼodham and other tribes. The Apache were to the east and northeast of the Oʼodham, and had probably moved into the area sometime in the fifteenth century AD. They had limited interest in farming, and preferred to raid neighboring troops for supplies. The eastern Oʼodham, the Sobapuris, bore the brunt of Apache attacks.

Diet 
The original Oʼodham diet consisted of regionally available wild game, insects, and plants. Through foraging, Oʼodham ate a variety of regional plants, such as: ironwood seed, honey mesquite, hog potato, and organ-pipe cactus fruit. While the Southwestern United States does not have an ideal climate for cultivating crops, Oʼodham cultivated crops of white tepary beans, peas, and Spanish watermelons. They hunted pronghorn antelope, gathered hornworm larvae, and trapped pack rats for sources of meat. Preparation of foods included steaming plants in pits and roasting meat on an open fire.

Saguaro cactus fruit was an especially important food. The Tohono Oʼodham use long sticks to harvest the fruits, which are then made into a variety of products including jams, syrups, and a ceremonial wine. The seeds are also edible, and were turned into porridge. The harvest begins in June; villages would travel to the saguaro stands for the duration of the harvest. Copious volumes of fruit are harvested; an example harvest in 1929 yielded  among 600 families. At the end of the harvest, each family would contribute a small amount of syrup to a communal stock that would be fermented by the medicine man. This was cause for rainmaking celebrations. Stories would be told, there was much dancing, and songs would be sung. Each man would drink some of the saguaro wine. The resulting intoxicated state was seen as holy, and any dreams it brought on were considered portentous. This was the only time that the Oʼodham drank alcohol during the year.

Ak cin, known as "mouth of the wash," refers to the farming method in which farmers would monitor the weather for signs of storm cloud formations. The appearance of storm clouds signified that there was going to be a downpour of rain. Farmers would anticipate these moments and quickly prep their plantations for seeding as the rain began to flood their lands. This type of agriculture was most commonly used during summer monsoons.

Traditional tribal foods were a combination of goods provided by nature and items they cultivated. From nature, the Tohono Oʼodham would consume rabbit, sap and flour from mesquite trees (flour was made by crushing the pods of the trees), cholla cactus, and acorns. On the agricultural side of their diet, farmers focused on corn, squash, and tepary beans.

Lost traditions, modern times 

It was not until more numerous Americans of Anglo-European ancestry began moving into the Arizona territory that the outsiders began to oppress the people's traditional ways. Unlike many tribes in the United States, the Tohono Oʼodham never signed a treaty with the federal government, but the Oʼodham experienced challenges common to other nations.

As Oʼodham communal lands were allocated to households and some "surplus" sold to non-Native Americans under the Dawes Act of 1888, a variety of religious groups entered the territory. Presbyterian missionaries built schools and missions there, vying with Roman Catholics and Mormons to convert the Oʼodham to their faith.

Major farmers established the cotton industry, initially employing many Oʼodham as agricultural workers. Under the U.S. federal Indian policy of the late 19th and early 20th century, the government required native children to attend Indian boarding schools. They were forced to use English, practice Christianity, and give up much of their tribal cultures in an attempt by the government to assimilate the children of various tribes into the American mainstream.

The current tribal government, established in the 1930s under the Indian Reorganization Act of 1934, reflects years of commercial, missionary, and federal intervention. While the federal government encouraged tribes to reestablish their governments, it approved models based on the electoral system and structure of the US. The goal was to make the Indians into "real" Americans, but the boarding schools generally offered training only for low-level domestic and agricultural labor, typical of jobs available in rural areas. "Assimilation" was the official policy, but full participation was not the goal. Boarding school students were supposed to function within the segregated society of the United States as economic laborers, not leaders.

The Tohono Oʼodham have retained many traditions into the twenty-first century, and still speak their language. Since the late 20th century, however, U.S. mass culture has penetrated and in some cases eroded Oʼodham traditions as their children adopt new trends in technology and other practices.

Health
Beginning in the 1960s, government intervention in the tribe's agricultural cultivation caused the Tohono Oʼodham tribe members to shift from a traditional plant-based diet to one that favored foods high in fat and calories. The government began to close off the tribe's water source, preventing the Indigenous group from being able to produce traditional crops. This resulted in the widespread trend of type 2 diabetes among members of the tribe. The adaptation of a processed food diet caused the presence of type 2 diabetes to rise at alarming rates, with nearly 60 percent of the adult population in the tribe facing this disease and 75 percent of children expected to contract this disease in their lifetime. Children are also at risk for childhood obesity.

Many of the original crops that the Indigenous group produced, such as tepary beans, squash, and the buds of cholla cactus, were items that could have aided in combating the diabetes crisis within the community. These foods possessed nutrients that would have helped normalize blood sugar and minimize the impact of diabetes. However, as a result of government intervention, many of these traditional foods were lost. A local nonprofit, Tohono Oʼodham Community Action (TOCA), has built a set of food systems programs that contribute to public health, cultural revitalization, and economic development. It has started a cafe that serves traditional foods.

The Tohono Oʼodham community has made efforts to combat future issues by attempting to rehabilitate the systems the tribe had in place before government intervention. The Indigenous group has been advocating for the restoration of their water privileges so that they will be able to effectively produce traditional crops for the tribe. Moreover, even in tribal schools, such as those in the local Baboquivari Unified School District, the quality of lunch programs is being reassessed in order to bring a larger emphasis of the need for healthier food options.

The Tohono Oʼodham Nation is one of the only Indigenous groups to offer tribal members access to medical treatment in the United States. Requirements for this enrollment include being a Mexican citizen and a member of the Tohono Oʼodham tribe. As advocacy for the border wall continues to grow, inspections and securities along these boundaries have heightened, limiting tribal members' access to resources beyond the border.

Cultural revitalization

The cultural resources of the Tohono Oʼodham are threatened—particularly the language—but are stronger than those of many other aboriginal groups in the United States.

Every February the nation holds the annual Sells Rodeo and Parade in its capital. Sells District rodeo has been an annual event since being founded in 1938. It celebrates traditional frontier skills of riding and managing cattle.

In the visual arts, Michael Chiago and the late Leonard Chana have gained widespread recognition for their paintings and drawings of traditional Oʼodham activities and scenes.  Chiago has exhibited at the Heard Museum and has contributed cover art to Arizona Highways magazine and University of Arizona Press books. Chana illustrated books by Tucson writer Byrd Baylor and created murals for Tohono Oʼodham Nation buildings.

In 2004, the Heard Museum awarded Danny Lopez its first heritage award, recognizing his lifelong work sustaining the desert people's way of life. At the National Museum for the American Indian (NMAI), the Tohono O'odham were represented in the founding exhibition and Lopez blessed the exhibit.

Tucson Indian School
The Tohono Oʼodham children were required to attend Indian boarding schools, designed to teach them the English language and assimilate them to the mainstream European-American ways. According to historian David Leighton, of the Arizona Daily Star newspaper, the Tohono Oʼodham attended the Tucson Indian School. This boarding school was founded in 1886, when T.C. Kirkwood, superintendent of the board of national missions of the Presbyterian Church in the United States, asked the Tucson Common Council for land near where the University of Arizona would be built.  The Common Council granted the Board of Home Missions a 99-year lease on land at $1 a year. The Board purchased  of land on the Santa Cruz River, from early pioneer Sam Hughes.

The new facility opened in 1888, with 54 boys and girls. At the new semi-religious boarding school, boys learned rural trades like carpentry and farming, while girls were taught sewing and similar domestic skills of the period. In 1890, additional buildings were completed but the school was still too small for the demand, and students had to be turned away.  To raise funds for the school and support its expansion, its superintendent entered into a contract with the city of Tucson to grade and maintain streets.  While officially called the Tucson Indian Training School, "any person of either sex, regardless of race or color", who showed "promise of development into a Christian leader or citizen and whose educational needs may, in the judgement of the school, be better served by the school than by another available resource" was eligible for admission.

In 1903, Jose Xavier Pablo, who later went on to become a leader in the Tohono Oʼodham Nation, graduated from the school. Three years later, the school bought the land they were leasing from the city of Tucson and sold it at a significant profit. In 1907, they purchased land just east of the Santa Cruz River, near present-day Ajo Way and built a new school. The new boarding school opened in 1908; it has a separate post office, known as the Escuela Post Office. Sometimes this name was used in place of the Tucson Indian School.

By the mid-1930s, the Tucson Indian School covered 160 acres, had 9 buildings and was capable of educating 130 students. In 1940, about 18 different tribes made up the population of students at the school. With changing ideas about education of tribal children, the federal government began to support education where the children lived with their families. By August 1953, it had no grades lower than 7th grade.  In 1960, the school closed its doors. The site was developed as Santa Cruz Plaza, just southwest of Pueblo Magnet High School.

Tohono Oʼodham Nation

The Tohono Oʼodham Nation within the United States occupies a reservation that incorporates a portion of its people's original Sonoran desert lands. It is organized into eleven districts. The land lies in three counties of the present-day state of Arizona: Pima, Pinal, and Maricopa. The 2000 census reported 10,787 people living on reservation land. The tribe's enrollment office tallies a population of 25,000, with 20,000 living on its Arizonan reservation lands.

Government
The nation is governed by a three branch system. The executive which includes a chairman and vice-chairman, who are elected by eligible adult members of the nation. According to their constitution, elections are conducted under a complex formula intended to ensure that the rights of small Oʼodham communities are protected, as well as the interests of the larger communities and families. The legislative branch which includes the tribal council which is made up two representatives from each of the twelve districts. The third branch is the Judical which includes five judges.  The present chairman is Ned Norris Jr, Vice Chairwoman is Wavalene Saunders, Legislative Chairman is Timothy Joaquin Gu Achi, and Chief Judge is Donald Harvey. This can all be found on the Nation's website.

Lands
Like other tribes, the Tohono Oʼodham felt land pressures from American ranchers, settlers, and the railroads. Documentation was poor, and many members did not leave their lands in a written will. John F. Trudell, a US attorney general assistant recorded an Oʼodham man declaring "I do not know anything about a land grant. The Mexicans never had any land to give us. From the earliest times our fathers have owned land which was given to them by the Earth's prophet." Because the Oʼodham lived on public lands or had no documentation of ownership, their holdings were threatened by white cattle herders in the 1880s. However, they used their history of cooperation with the government in the Apache Wars to bargain for land rights. Today, Oʼodham lands are made up of multiple reservations:
The land area is 97.48 percent of the reservation's total, and the population is 77.65 percent of the total of the entire reservation lands.
 The San Lucy District comprises seven small non-contiguous parcels of land in, and northwest of, the town of Gila Bend in southwestern Maricopa County.
 The Florence Village District is located just southwest of the town of Florence in central Pinal County.

Tohono Oʼodham Community Action (TOCA) 
The Tohono Oʼodham Community Action (TOCA) was founded by current CEO and President Terrol Dew Johnson and co-founder Tristan Reader in 1996 on the basis of wanting to restore and re-integrate lost tribal traditions into the community. Located in Sells, Arizona, they originally started as a community garden and offered basketweaving classes. Now, the organization has expanded to having its own two farms, restaurant, and art gallery.

Another influence to the creation of this organization originates from the fact that the Indigenous tribe was on the brink of collapse as a result of growing dependency on welfare and food stamps. The Tohono Oʼodham people were facing the lowest per capita income of any Indigenous reservation, with 65 percent of members living below the poverty line and 70 percent facing unemployment. Crime amongst the younger generation rapidly increased as a result of gang activity and the high school drop out rate was over 50 percent. Homicide was prevalent within the community, with the rate being three times the national average.

In 2009, TOCA opened its restaurant, Desert Rain Café. The purpose of the cafe's launch was to bring traditional tribal foods to the community in order to help combat the growing presence of Type 2 diabetes. Thus, the restaurant practices the integration of traditional foods with each menu item containing at least one traditional ingredient, such as mesquite meal, prickly pear, or agave syrup. For crops such as tepary beans or squash, the café utilizes their farms to produce these goods, providing customers with fresh meals. Some of their dishes include a Mesquite Oatmeal Cookie, Short Rib Stew, Brown Tepary bean Quesadilla, or pico de gallo. It has been estimated that the restaurant serves over 100,000 meals yearly.

Basket weaving was a dominant cultural characteristic, being used in rain ceremonies that lasted for four days and nights. These baskets were also purposed for daily use to hold or prepare foods. At the start of the institution, Johnson would hold weekly classes on Wednesday for artisans throughout the reservation. Making a basket could take as long as one year. This prolonged process stems from the fact that the fibers used in these baskets must be harvested and prepared, plus creating a design that represents the history of the Tohono Oʼodham nation. Materials for baskets vary between grasses native to the area, such as Yucca grass and devil's claw plant, an awl, and knife.

Martin Luther King Jr.'s first visit to an Indian reservation

On April 2, 2017, in the Arizona Daily Star newspaper, historian David Leighton related what is believed to be Martin Luther King Jr's first visit to an Indian reservation, the Tohono Oʼodham Indian Reservation.

On September 20, 1959, Martin Luther King Jr. flew to Tucson from Los Angeles to give a talk at the Sunday Evening Forum. On that night, he gave a speech called "A Great Time To Be Alive," at the University of Arizona auditorium, now called Centennial Hall. Following the forum, a reception was held for King, in which he was introduced to Rev. Casper Glenn, the pastor of a multiracial church called the Southside Presbyterian Church. King was very interested in this racially mixed church and made arrangements to visit it the next day.

The following morning, Glenn picked up King in his Plymouth station wagon and drove him to the Southside Presbyterian Church. There, Glenn showed King photographs he had taken of the racially diverse congregation, most of whom were part of the Tohono Oʼodham tribal group at the time. Glenn remembers that upon seeing the photos, "King said he had never been on an Indian reservation, nor had he ever had a chance to get to know any Indians." He then requested to be driven to the nearby reservation, as a spur-of-the-moment desire.

The two men traveled on Ajo Way to Sells, on what was then called the Papago Indian Reservation, now the Tohono Oʼodham Indian Reservation. When they arrived at the tribal council office, the tribal leaders were surprised to see King and very honored he had come to visit them. King was very anxious to talk to them but was circumspect with his questions. "He was fascinated by everything that they shared with him," Glenn said.

The ministers then went to the local Presbyterian church in Sells, which had been recently constructed by its members, with funds provided by the national Presbyterian church. King had a chance to speak to Pastor Towsand, who was excited to meet King. On the way back to Tucson, "King expressed his appreciation of having the opportunity to meet the Indians," Glenn recalled.

Districts

 Gu Achi District
 Pisinemo District
 Sif Oidak District
 Sells District
 Baboquivari District
 Hickiwan District
 San Lucy District
 Gu Vo District
 Chukut Kuk District
 San Xavier District
 Schuk Toak District

Notable Tohono Oʼodham

 Annie Antone, contemporary, pictorial basketweaver
 Maria Chona, basketweaver
 Juan Dolores, early Tohono Oʼodham linguist
 Terrol Dew Johnson, basketweaver and native food and health advocate
 Augustine Lopez, Tohono Oʼodham nation chairman
 Raul Mendoza, basketball coach
 Ponka-We Victors, Kansas state legislator
 Ofelia Zepeda, linguist, poet, writer

See also

 Oʼodham language
 Akimel Oʼodham (River people)
 Hia C-eḍ Oʼodham (Sand people)
 List of dwellings of Pueblo peoples
 Camp Grant massacre
 Chicken scratch
 Shadow Wolves
 Sobaipuri
 Tohono Oʼodham High School

References

Further reading
 Frances Manuel and Deborah Neff,  Desert Indian Woman. Tucson: University of Arizona Press, 2001.
 Wesley Bliss, "In the Wake of the Wheel: Introduction of the Wagon to the Papago Indians of Southern Arizona", in E.H. Spicer (ed.), Human Problems in Technological Change. New York: Russell Sage Foundation Publications, 1952; pp. 23–33.
 Eloise David and Marcia Spark, "Arizona Folk Art Recalls History of Papago Indians", The Clarion, Fall 1978.
 Jason H. Gart, Papago Park: A History of Hole-in-the-Rock from 1848 to 1995. Pueblo Grande Museum Occasional Papers No. 1, (1997).
 Andrae M. Marak and Laura Tuennerman, At the Border of Empires: The Tohono O'odham, Gender, and Assimilation, 1880–1934. Tucson: University of Arizona Press, 2013. 
 Allan J. McIntyre, The Tohono Oʼodham and Pimeria Alta. Arcadia Publishing, 2008. 
 Deni J. Seymour, "A Syndetic Approach to Identification of the Historic Mission Site of San Cayetano Del Tumacácori", International Journal of Historical Archaeology, vol. 11, no. 3 (2007), pp. 269–296.
 Deni J. Seymour, "Delicate Diplomacy on a Restless Frontier: Seventeenth-Century Sobaipuri Social And Economic Relations in Northwestern New Spain, Part I". New Mexico Historical Review, vol. 82, no. 4 (2007).
 Deni J. Seymour, "Delicate Diplomacy on a Restless Frontier: Seventeenth-Century Sobaipuri Social And Economic Relations in Northwestern New Spain, Part II". New Mexico Historical Review, vol. 83, no. 2 (2008).
 David Leighton, "Street Smarts: Tucson Indian School taught hoeing, sewing", Arizona Daily Star, February 10, 2015
 David Leighton, "Street Smarts: MLK Jr. raised his voice to the rafters in Tucson", Arizona Daily Star, April 2, 2017

External links
 
 
 Tohono O'odham / ITCA (Inter Tribal Council of Arizona)
 Tohono O'odham Community Action (TOCA)
 TOCA's Desert Rain Cafe
 How To Speak Tohono Oʼodham – Video
 Tohono Oʼodham utilities
 O'odham Solidarity Project
 Online Tohono O'odham bibliography
 Tohono O'ʼodham, Papago in Sonora, Mexico

Tohono O'odham
Native American tribes in Arizona
Federally recognized tribes in the United States
Southwest tribes